The name Durian has been used to name two tropical cyclones in the Western Pacific Ocean. The name was submitted by Thailand, and refers to a Southeast Asian fruit of the same name.

 Tropical Storm Durian (2001) (T0103, 05W), made landfall in China, killing 78.
 Typhoon Durian (2006) (T0621, 24W, Reming), killed 1,497 people in the Philippines and Vietnam.

The name Durian was retired from use following the 2006 Pacific typhoon season and was replaced with Mangkhut.

See also
 Hurricane Doreen, a similar name which been used in the Eastern Pacific Ocean.
 List of storms named Dorian, a similar name which had been used in the Atlantic Ocean.

Pacific typhoon set index articles